The 1967–68 Lancashire Combination was the 67th in the history of the Lancashire Combination, a football competition in England.

Division One

League table

Division Two

League table

External links 
 Lancashire Combination League Tables at RSSSF

1967–68 in English football leagues
Lancashire Combination